Dinophora is a genus of flowering plants belonging to the family Melastomataceae.

Its native range is Western Tropical Africa to Angola.

Species:
 Dinophora spenneroides Benth.

References

Melastomataceae
Melastomataceae genera